L.F. Deardorff & Sons Inc. was a manufacturer of wooden-construction, large-format 4"x5" and larger bellows view camera from 1923 through 1988. They were used by professional photographic studios.

Company history
Laban F. Deardorff repaired cameras for nearly 30 years before building the first 8x10 Deardorff. He had been employed by Rochester Camera Company in Rochester, New York, during the 1890s.

Model history

Almost all Deardorff cameras were made of mahogany.
 1923 saw the first model, the V8 (or VO8)  built in Chicago. 15 models were built.
 1924 V8 – 50 units built
 1925 V8 – 175 units built
 1926 – the first batch production. Reference to a 5x7 Deardorff
 1937 – started nickel plating and changed to mahogany wood.
 1938 – stainless steel first used
 1942 – rounded corners for the lens boards
 1944 – Spanish cedar used in some cameras
 1950 – front swing capability first introduced; 8"x10" camera serial numbers begin at "500" in May 1950
 1952 – round metal bed plate
 1967 – knobs changed to aluminum from nickel-plated brass
 1988 – last year of production
 Present – cameras are still in production today, in small quantities, but built to original Chicago specifications

General features

All of the Deardorff view cameras featured swing and tilt movements, and there were optional accessories such as stands and cases.

The 8x20, 12x20, 11x14
All Deardorff model featured:
 Vertical swing of the back
 Lateral swing of the back
 Vertical swing of the front 30 degrees each side of center

Photographers' experiences in using the camera
Photographer David Munson has related his experiences in restoring and using a Deardorff 8x10. Kevin Klazek also related his experience in restoring a Deardorff V8 in ''View Camera'' magazine.

Publications showing Deardorffs
The February 1998 25th anniversary edition of Texas Monthly featured a Deardorff on the cover and said: The cover shot with the lens in the shape of the state of Texas, mounted on an 8x10 Deardorff, was shot by Pete McArthur. The lens itself was designed by Rick Elden. The work of over 75 photographers was included in their "100 best", including Richard Avedon, Annie Leibovitz, Helmut Newton, Jim Myers, Kent Kirkley, Mary Ellen Mark, Larry Fink and many others.

See also
 Field camera

References

External links
 "Large Format Field Camera Guide"
 "Flanges & Retainers" "Large stock of finished USA and Metric mounting rings." This site is good for parts.
 "Firmware update for Deardorff V8?" Note: This is a parody on digital!
 Deardorff on Camerapedia
 Harry's Pro Shop for Used Large Format Cameras
 Igor's Camera Exchange - Large Format Cameras
 The Wisner/Zone VI History
 Large Format Parts
 The View Camera Store - Deardorff 8x10 Lensboard
 Jack Deardorff Dead in November 2007
 Photo Gizmo, Inc.
 Light Stalkers
 Precision Camera & Video Equipment: Rental Large Format Equipment
 Analog Photography User's Group - Deardorff Restoration discussion
 Ground Glass Specialties featuring Satin Snow Groundglass
 Camera History Links

Deardorff